Industriales is a Cuban baseball team.

Industriales may also refer to:

Industriales de Monterrey, Mexican baseball team
Industriales de Valencia, Venezuelan baseball team
Industriales Naucalpan F.C., Mexican football club
Industriales station, Medellin Metro, Colombia